Herlong is a census-designated place in Lassen County, California. Its population is 237 as of the 2020 census, down from 298 from the 2010 census. The community is accessible to U.S. Route 395 via Lassen County Route A25 or Lassen County Route A26.

History

Herlong was developed in 1942 after the attack on Pearl Harbor during World War II, to house civilian workers to support the Sierra Army Depot, one of several ammunition storage facilities located inland in order to be safe from Japanese attack. The site also met the requirement of being a dry and isolated area. The community was named after Captain Henry W. Herlong, the first United States Army ordnance officer to die in World War II.  The postal stamps, money orders and equipment bore the spelling "Hurlong", which lasted for about five days; the error was discovered and corrected.

In the 21st century, Sierra Army Depot serves as the Army's End of First Life Center and the CONUS-based Army Prepositioned Stock Site. It continues to provide expeditionary logistics support and long-term sustainment solutions.

Since its beginning, the town has varied in size. Its population peaked at about 5,000 in the 1950s, consisting mostly of civilian employees on the base and their families. As of the 2010 census, the community had 298 people.

Herlong has several churches, including the Bible Baptist Church, Assembly of God, and  Southern Baptist.  The State Office of Historic Preservation lists 62 historic properties in Herlong on its Historic Properties Data File for Lassen County. This is one of the last counties in California that is still considered to be "open range" land.

Geography

Climate
This region experiences warm (but not hot) and dry summers, with no average monthly temperatures above 71.6 °F.  According to the Köppen Climate Classification system, Herlong has a warm-summer Mediterranean climate, abbreviated "Csb" on climate maps.

Demographics

The 2010 United States Census reported that Herlong had a population of 298. The racial makeup of Herlong was 187 (62.8%) White, 38 (12.8%) African American, 16 (5.4%) Native American, 1 (0.3%) Asian, 3 (1.0%) Pacific Islander, 9 (3.0%) from other races, and 44 (14.8%) from two or more races. Hispanic or Latino of any race were 46 persons (15.4%).

The Census reported that 293 people (98.3% of the population) lived in households, 5 (1.7%) lived in non-institutionalized group quarters, and 0 (0%) were institutionalized.

There were 116 households, out of which 46 (39.7%) had children under the age of 18 living in them, 32 (27.6%) were opposite-sex married couples living together, 25 (21.6%) had a female householder with no husband present, 9 (7.8%) had a male householder with no wife present.  There were 16 (13.8%) unmarried opposite-sex partnerships, and 1 (0.9%) same-sex married couples or partnerships. 35 households (30.2%) were made up of individuals, and 5 (4.3%) had someone living alone who was 65 years of age or older. The average household size was 2.53.  There were 66 families (56.9% of all households); the average family size was 3.21.

The population was spread out, with 91 people (30.5%) under the age of 18, 22 people (7.4%) aged 18 to 24, 96 people (32.2%) aged 25 to 44, 80 people (26.8%) aged 45 to 64, and 9 people (3.0%) who were 65 years of age or older.  The median age was 31.5 years. For every 100 females, there were 101.4 males.  For every 100 females age 18 and over, there were 97.1 males.

The homeowner vacancy rate was 0%; the rental vacancy rate was 14.1%.  0 people (0% of the population) lived in owner-occupied housing units and 293 people (98.3%) lived in rental housing units.

Government

Texas State Representative John V. Garza and U.S. Representative from Iowa, Mariannette Miller-Meeks were born in Herlong.

See also
Federal Correctional Institution, Herlong

References

External links
Historic American Engineering Record Sierra Army Depot
Sierra Army Depot
Sierra Army Depot

Census-designated places in Lassen County, California
Census-designated places in California
1942 establishments in California